Ihab is a given name. Notable people with the name include:

Ihab al-Ghussein, spokesman of the Interior Ministry of the Palestinian National Authority based in the Hamas-administrated Gaza Strip
Ihab Al-Sherif (1954–2005), served as Egypt's ambassador to Iraq until Iraqi kidnappers murdered him in July 2005
Ihab El-Masry, Egyptian footballer
Ihab Hassan (born 1925), American literary theorist and writer born in Egypt
Ihab Ilyas, computer scientist
Ihab Saqr, believed to have coordinated the bombing of the Egyptian embassy in Islamabad
Ihab Shoukri, Northern Irish paramilitary

See also
I have a Bee (IHAB), worldwide organization of hobby beekeepers
International Habitation Module, the main habitat module of the Lunar Gateway station, to be built by the European Space Agency (ESA) in collaboration with the Japan Aerospace Exploration Agency (JAXA)

Arabic masculine given names